Jale Bainisika (1914/1915  February 2020) was a Fijian military officer and the oldest and the last surviving veteran of World War II from Fiji. He was also the only surviving officer of Fiji to have fought in Malayan campaign, the Solomon Islands campaign, and the Bougainville campaign.

He was one of the 30 military personnel who voluntarily became a part of the 1st Commando Unit to work with the United States Army for spying on opponents during World War II in Guadalcanal. Bainisika was also one of the first Fijian to be assigned by Fiji Commandos with duties on spying on opponent.

Biography 
Bainisika was born in Tailevu Province. He joined the Fiji Infantry Regiment in 1942 and became a member of the 3rd Battalion.

After enlisting in the army, his duty begun in March 1944 until he returned on 7 September. He was discharged from the service on October 17, 1945.

References

Further reading 
 

1910s births
2020 deaths
Military personnel of World War II
Fijian soldiers
Fijian centenarians
Men centenarians
People from Tailevu Province